Ashkan Rahgozar (born 12 April 1986 in Tehran) is an author, director and filmmaker of multiple Animation movies . He is founder and chief executive of Hoorakhsh Studios. He earned his bachelor of arts degree in graphic design and master of arts degree in illustration.

Career
In 1999, Ashkan started his professional career in Saba Animation Centre and in 2004 he established his own animation production studio, Hoorakhsh 7th Sky. Along with a team of young artists, they produced multiple 2D computer animation both for promotion and commercial purpose. Since then he has concentrated on writing and directing short and feature animation.

Education
School of Broadcasting - Islamic Republic of Iran 
BA degree in Graphic Design from Enghelāb-e Eslāmi Technical College
MA degree in Illustration from Islamic Azad University, Central Tehran Branch

Art works

Animated Feature
2008-2017, “The Last Fiction” Animated Feature (author/director/producer)

Animated Short
2006, “Epic of Tirgan” Animated Short (author/director/animator) 
2006, “The Short Part” Animated Short (author/director/animator) 
2006, “Café Dulape” Animated Short (author/director/[producer)
2007, “Qajari’s Cat” Animated Short (author/director/producer)
2007, “Ramadan Month” Episodic Animations 
2007, “Question Mark” Animated Short (editor/producer)
2007, “Passive Defense” Animated Short (supervisor of animators)
2007, “Qeimeh” Animated Short (supervisor of animators)
2009, “Always Pars” Animated Documentary (supervisor of animators)
2009, “You …!” Animated Short (author/director/producer)
2009, “In Waves of  the Sindh” Animated Short (editor/producer) 
2009, “Vise Versa” Animated Short (producer)
2009, “Zagho Panir” Animated Short (supervisor of animators)
2013, “Tormented Sleep” Animated Short (counselor/producer)
2013, “Prey” Animated Short (counselor/producer)
2013, “Cut..!” Animated Short (author/producer)

Teasers
2006-2008, produced more than 30 minutes of Motion Graphics for national and international channels (animator/director)
2006, produced 3D scientific simulation for The Boeing Company (animator/director) 
2006, produced 3D simulation for mechanism of recycling lines (animator/director)
2008, produced Teaser of Robotic Contest for “Amirkabir University of Technology” (producer)
2008, produced Emergency Medical of "Dr. Manafi"  (author/director)
2008, produced Advertisement Teaser of" DIOX Chain Stores" (author/director/producer)
2009-2010, produced teasers and arm stations for 39th and 40th “Roshd International Film Festival” (author/director/producer)

Music Videos
Music video of “If You Go Away” - Shirley Bassey
Music video of “Pegasus” - King Raam
Music video of “Ishala” - Bomrani Band
Music videos of Siamak Abbasi, Mohammad Ali Salahshoor, and Mahdi Yarahi (producer)

Games
2010, The Game “Alimardan Khan’s Mischief” (author/art director)
2010, The Game “Murder in Teheran's Alleys 1933” (art director)
2010-2011, The Game “Qajari’s Cat” (author/art director/character designer)
2011, The Game “Forgotten Sound” (author/art director)
2011, The Game “Dark Years” (art director)
2011, The Game “The Way of Love” (art director)

Illustration
Khoshbakhtit Arezoome - A collection of Siamak Abbasi lyrics (illustrator)

Awards
Invitation of “The Last Fiction” by Annecy Animation Festival to a program named “Annecy goes to Cannes” for presenting in “Cannes film festival”
. 2016
“The Last Fiction” - Winner of the Cocomix Music Award from Bucheon International Animation Festival
“The Last Fiction” - Winner of Best Animated Movie from International Animation Festival AJAYU – Peru, 2019
“The Last Fiction” - Winner of Best Animated Movie, Epic ACG fest, 2019 
“The Last Fiction” - Crystal Simorgh for Best Animated Feature from Fajr International Film Festival, 2019 
“The Last Fiction” - Winner of Best Director, Best Screen Play and Special Jury Awards, from International Film Festival for Children and Youth, Isfahan, 2018 
“The Last Fiction” - Winner of Best Animation Movie from Southern Cone International Film Festival, 2019
“The Last Fiction” - Best Animation Feature Film from GIRAF International Festival of Independent Animation, 2018
“The Last Fiction” - Best Animated Feature and Best International Animated Feature from Tehran Animation Festival, 2018
“You!” - Honorary Diploma for the animated short “You!” at Tehran International Animation Festival
Silver Statue for creating unique projects from Tehran International Animation Festival.
Asifa‘s Special Prize for creating unique projects.
Special thanks for advanced technology from 5th Digital Media Festival.
Honorary Diploma for digital illustration from 5th Digital Media Festival.

Nominations
“The Last Fiction” - Nominated for Best Animated Feature from Palm Springs Intl. Animation Festival & Expo, 2019
“The Last Fiction” - Nominated for Best Animated Feature from International Fantastic Film Festival of Catalonia (Sitges Film Festival), 2018 
“Ishala” – Finalist nomination for the best animated music video competition - Seoul International Cartoon & Animation Festival (SICAF) 2016
“Ishala” – Selected for screening - Art All Night Trenton, 2016
“Ishala” – Nominated - Athens Animfest 2016
“Ishala” – Official Selection - Cartoon Club, 2016, Italy
“Pegasus” – Selected for screening - Art All Night Trenton, 2016
“Pegasus” – Nominated in competition- Comicpalooza 2016
“Pegasus” – Official Selection competition - Athens Animfest, 2016
“Pegasus” – Selected for screening - VOTD 2015
“Pegasus” – Selected for screening - Open World Animation Pennsylvania, 2015
“Pegasus” – Official Selection - Anim’est Bucharest Animation Film Festival 2016
“Think About It” – Nominated for the best animated short - Libelula Russia Film Festival, 2015
“Think About It” – Presented - IZMIR Film Festival, 2015
“Think About It” – Nominated for the best short animated movie - Golden Sun Malta, 2015
“Think About It” – Nominated in animation category of 17th House of Cinema Celebration
“think About It” – Official Selection  -Ozark Shorts, 2016
“The Story Box” – Nominated for the best TV series - Tufuzi Georgia Film Festival, 2015
“The Story Box” – Official Selection - Reanimania Animation Film Festival, 2015
“If You Go away” – Selected for screening - Zagreb Animfest, 2016
“If You Go Away” – Official Selection - Anifim Czech Festival, 2016
“If You Go Away” – Official Selection - Glas Animation Festival, 2016
“If You Go Away” – Official Selection - Siggraph Computer Graphics & Interactive Techniques, 2015
“If You Go Away” – Official Selection - Brussels Anima Festival, 2015
“If You Go Away” – Official Selection - Armenia Reanimania Festival, 2015
“If You Go Away” – Official Selection - Annecy Animation Festival, 2015
“If You go away” – Official Selection – OZARK Shorts, 2016
“If You go away” – Official Selection - Iranian Film Festival, San Francisco, 2016
“The Forgotten Sound” – Second place of the best music - 3rd Tehran Computer Games Festival

References

External links

 
 
 

1986 births
Living people
Iranian film directors
Iranian animated film directors
Iranian film producers
Iranian animators
People from Tehran